St Hilary's Church may refer to:

United Kingdom
 St Hilary's Chapel (also known as St Hilary's Church), Denbigh, Denbighshire, Wales
 St Hilary's Church, St Hilary (Cornwall), England
 St Hilary's Church, St Hilary (Vale of Glamorgan), Wales
 St Hilary's Church, Wallasey, Merseyside, England

United States
 St. Hilary Roman Catholic Church, Washington, Pennsylvania
 Old Saint Hilary's Church, Marin County, California